David Massamba (born 4 June 1992) is a Gabonese football midfielder who plays for CS Hammam-Lif.

References

1992 births
Living people
Gabonese footballers
Gabon international footballers
US Bitam players
CF Mounana players
CS Hammam-Lif players
Association football midfielders
Gabonese expatriate footballers
Expatriate footballers in Tunisia
Gabonese expatriate sportspeople in Tunisia
Tunisian Ligue Professionnelle 1 players
Footballers from Kinshasa
21st-century Gabonese people
21st-century Democratic Republic of the Congo people